Leonardsburg is an unincorporated community in Delaware County, in the U.S. state of Ohio.

History
Leonardsburg was laid out in 1852, and named for A. Leonard, the town's first storekeeper. A post office called Leonardsburgh was established in 1852, the name was changed to Leonardsburg in 1893, and the post office closed in 1972.

References

Unincorporated communities in Delaware County, Ohio
Unincorporated communities in Ohio